Güemes - la tierra en armas (English: "Güemes, The Armed Land") is a 1971 Argentine war drama film written and directed by Leopoldo Torre Nilsson and starring Norma Aleandro, Alfredo Alcón and Mercedes Sosa. It was entered into the 7th Moscow International Film Festival. It is based on the life of revolutionaries general Martín Miguel de Güemes and commander Juana Azurduy.

Cast
 Alfredo Alcón as Güemes
 Norma Aleandro as Macacha Güemes
 Gabriela Gili as Carmen
 José Slavin as Gen. de la Serna
 Mercedes Sosa as Juana Azurduy
 Alfredo Duarte
 Alfredo Iglesias
 Luis María Mathé
 Rodolfo Brindisi
 José Oroño
 Tito Rinaldi
 José María Labernié
 Oscar Del Valle
 Teresa Montenegro
 Carlos Lise

See also
 Martín Miguel de Güemes

References

External links
 

1971 films
1970s war drama films
Works about the Argentine War of Independence
Films set in the 19th century
1970s Spanish-language films
Films directed by Leopoldo Torre Nilsson
Argentine war drama films
1971 drama films
1970s Argentine films